The 1986–87 Ranji Trophy was the 53rd season of the Ranji Trophy. Hyderabad won their second title defeating Delhi on first innings lead.

Highlights
 Carlton Saldanha, who was the top scorer of the season, scored 89, 77, 70, 74, 84, 70 and 142 in his first seven innings.

Group stage

North Zone

Central Zone

West Zone

South Zone

East Zone

Knockout stage 

(Q) - Advanced to next round on better Quotient.

Final

Scorecards and averages
Espncricinfo

References

External links

Ranji Trophy
Ranji Trophy
Ranji Trophy seasons